A list of Japanese films that were released in Japan in 2013. 591 Japanese films were released, earning ¥117 billion (US$1.14 billion) and accounting for 60.6% of the total box office in Japan. 34 earned over ¥1 billion (US$9.68 million), with the highest-grossing being The Wind Rises with ¥12 billion (US$116 million).

Highest-grossing films

List of films

References

 2013 in Japan
 2013 in Japanese television
 List of 2013 box office number-one films in Japan

2013
Lists of 2013 films by country or language
Fil